The Silver Antelope Award is used to recognize registered adult Scouters of exceptional character who have provided distinguished service within one of the geographical regions of the Boy Scouts of America. The recognition was presented by the National Court of Honor on behalf of the four regions of the Boy Scouts of America – Central, Western, Southern, and Northeast until 2021. Beginning in 2022, as a result of the reorganization of the National Council they will be presented on behalf of the 16 National Service Territories (NST). Completed nomination forms are submitted to local councils for Scout executive approval, then submitted electronically to the National Court of Honor; awards are presented each year as part of the BSA National Council Annual Meeting or at another appropriate occasion. Recipients receive a certificate, an embroidered square knot emblem for the field uniform, and the Silver Antelope medal. The medal is a silver antelope suspended from an orange and white ribbon for formal occasions and civilian wear.  Recipients also receive a lapel pin for non-uniform wear.

Unlike the Silver Buffalo Award, recipients must be registered as adult members of the Boy Scouts of America.

This list of recipients of the Silver Antelope Award includes people who have been awarded the highest region-level commendation of the Boy Scouts of America.

See also 
 Silver Antelope Award

References

Silver Antelope
Silver Antelope
Advancement and recognition in the Boy Scouts of America